The 10TP was a Polish light cruiser tank that never left the prototype status. While advancing the Polish armour development programme, the prototype was deemed unsuccessful. Discoveries made during testing led to the design phase of the newer 14TP model, which was never completed due to the onset of World War II.

The 10TP prototype itself was of an original design implementing some general ideas suggested by John Walter Christie but also many new technical solutions.

History 
At the end of the 1920s, the Polish Armed Forces felt that they needed a new tank model. The Wojskowy Instytut Badań Inżynierii, WIBI ("Military Institute of Engineering Research") sent Captain Ruciński to the United States to legally acquire a Christie M1928 tank, its blueprints and license production rights. The tank was to be used as a base for a new Polish light tank. The Poles however never received the machine and Christie, fearing legal charges, refunded the purchase.

Due to this failure to purchase the master model and the possible license, at the end of 1930 the WIBI Tank Design Bureau began preliminary design work on their own wheeled/tracked tank, based on the Christie M1928 and the Christie M1931  known under the working name "A la Christie".

The work was based on available data and advertising leaflets as well as notes and sketches that Captain Ruciński obtained from Christie. In 1932 the design drawings and a list of details were ready but soon the work slowed down because the designers were put in charge of a just-bought British Vickers Mark E tank that led to the 7TP light tank which was developed soon after.

At the end of 1934, because of the liquidation of WIBI and establishing of the Design and Testing Centre of the Armoured Forces reporting directly to the Armoured Forces Command, most of the "A la Christie" project documentation was destroyed under the supervision of a special commission. Only a few hand-written notes and calculations were left.

On 10 March 1935 design work on a new model called 10TP was started. Major Rudolf Gundlach headed the design team consisting of, among the others, engineers Jan Łapuszewski, Stefan Ołdakowski, Mieczysław Staszewski, Kazimierz Hejnowicz and process engineer Jerzy Napiórkowski.

Despite the fact that in 1936 the vehicle design was not completely finished, it was included in the programme of Armoured Forces that was a part of a general projection of growth and upgrade for the Polish Army for 1936-1942. This programme was approved by the Armament and Equipment Committee (Komitet do spraw Uzbrojenia i Sprzętu, KSUS) in January 1936. The 10TP tank was specified on the list of the equipment scheduled to equip four tank battalions in the new motorised units.

Assembly of the first tank prototype was commenced in 1937 in the Experimental Workshop (WD) located within the area of the State Engineering Plants (PZInż.) Factory in Ursus near Warsaw, where all Polish tanks were produced during 1931-1939. The work was supervised by Captain Kazimierz Grüner. At the same time two motorised cavalry brigades were formed with the intention that they would be equipped with the tank.

Building of the tank was completed in July 1938. It took so much time because some basic assemblies that were not produced in Poland had to be acquired abroad - for instance an engine of sufficient power. It was not before 16 August that the 10TP tank rolled out for a first longer ride. It was driven by an experienced military specialist Sergeant Polinarek under the personal supervision of the Chief of the Trial and Experiment Department in the Bureau of Technical Studies on Armored Weapons (Biuro Badań Technicznych Broni Pancernych, BBT Br.Panc.) Captain Leon Czekalski. The trials were kept secret because the activities of the German Abwehr and the members of the "Fifth Column" were then getting more and more intensive in Poland.

Further trials were stopped by minor faults until 30 September and then the tank was sent to the WD where design modifications were made. On 16 January 1939 the tank was tested, under supervision of its chief designer, along a short distance trip to Łowicz and in the spring, between 22 and 25 April, it went beyond Grodno, traveling a total distance of 610 km. In May, the refurbished tank was demonstrated to generals and other top ranking military authorities.

The designers, having analysed their experiences came to the conclusion that a tank of this type should be a purely tracked vehicle and any equipment needed for driving it on wheels was just an unnecessary weight. Getting rid of this weight allowed them to increase the armour thickness significantly while vehicle weight remained unchanged. Thus another development step of the 10TP was to be the 14TP tank. Its construction was started in the end of 1938 but it was not completed due to the war.

Before the tank could enter mass production, the German invasion of Poland in September 1939 ended the independent existence of the Second Polish Republic.

Design 
The 10TP tank had a wide hull that made it possible to put two members of the crew inside side by side, a front machine gun and a two-man turret. A solution to the problem of driving the vehicle both on wheels and tracks followed the American design, however Polish designers developed new, wider tracks, drive sprockets and a way of link hooking and moving. The tank steering system using hydraulic servomechanisms was their own advanced solution significantly affecting combat performance of the whole vehicle.

See also 
 Gundlach tank periscope
 List of armoured fighting vehicles of World War II

References

External links 
10TP Polish cruiser tank 
Janusz Magnuski'a article on 10TP (Archived 2009-10-19)
Gallery
 czołg lekki 10 TP (14 TP)
 Czołg 10TP (14TP)

Light tanks of Poland
World War II armoured fighting vehicles of Poland
Science and technology in Poland
World War II light tanks